William Thomson Newnham (February 7, 1923 – August 23, 2014) was a Canadian educator and the first president of Seneca College serving from 1967 through 1984.

Early life
Newnham was born in Shallow Lake, Ontario.

After serving in the Royal Canadian Air Force in World War II, Newnham went to Queen's University to study physics and math.

Following his graduation Newnham became a teacher and later was the principal of Northview Heights Secondary School in North York from 1959 to 1966.

President of Seneca College (1967-1984)
Newnham became President of Seneca College in 1967 and served until 1984.

From a humble start with 800 students, under Newnham’s leadership, Seneca earned a reputation for the quality of its programs and its innovative leadership.

During his time in office, Newnham saw the expansion of the college from the Sheppard/Yonge locations to prominent campuses on Finch Avenue, and in King City and Markham (Buttonville Airport).

Under President Newnham's leadership, Seneca pioneered teaching in areas that were new to colleges, such as computing courses, and became a leader in international outreach.

Throughout his life Newnham authored several books about the teaching profession.

Honors
Seneca's main campus in North York, Newnham Campus, was renamed in his honour in 1984. The campus was formerly known as Finch Campus.

Personal life
After retirement, William Newnham lived in Unionville, Ontario.

Death
William Newnham died in Markham, Ontario from natural causes, aged 91, August 23, 2014.

References

1923 births
2014 deaths
People from Markham, Ontario
Queen's University at Kingston alumni
Presidents of Seneca College